Charles O'Connell (1805–1877) from Ballynabloun, Co. Kerry, was an Irish politician, the Member of Parliament for Kerry from 1832 to 1835, sitting as a member of the Whig party.

Life
He was born on 12 August 1805, the son of Daniel O'Connell of Ballinabloun and Theresa Lombard.

O'Connell served as an officer in the 73rd Regiment. He married Catherine (Kate), the second daughter of Daniel O'Connell in 1832 and was known by the nickname Long Charlie.

He died aged 71 on 20 January 1877.

References

1805 births
1877 deaths
Members of the Parliament of the United Kingdom for County Kerry constituencies (1801–1922)
UK MPs 1832–1835
Charles
Politicians from County Kerry
Irish Repeal Association MPs